Barry Scott Quinn (born 9 May 1979) is an Irish retired footballer. His position was defender.

Quinn was signed up by Coventry City in August 1996 as a trainee from Manortown United. He went on to appear seventy-four times for the club. In the 2004 January transfer window, he was loaned out to Rushden & Diamonds, who at the time were playing in League One. After appearing four times for Rushden, Quinn returned to Coventry, where he was released. He won four caps at international level for the Republic of Ireland.

He signed for Oxford United in May 2004 on a free transfer. In 2006–07 season he won the Player's Player of the Year award after a highly consistent year. Shortly after receiving the reward, manager Jim Smith informed Oxford United fans that Barry was to take the captain's armband for the following season.  On 30 April 2009, after 199 appearances in his 2 spells at Oxford United, the club announced that Quinn had been released and would not be offered a new deal.

In July 2010 he moved to Brackley Town.

He also had a share in the company GQL which owned a Bar/Restaurant in Coventry City Centre, this was then placed into administration as it did not generate enough revenue. It was later liquidated.

Quinn played for the Republic of Ireland national under-19 football team in the 1997 UEFA European Under-18 Football Championship finals in Iceland.

Notes

External links

1979 births
Living people
Association footballers from Dublin (city)
Republic of Ireland association footballers
Republic of Ireland youth international footballers
Republic of Ireland under-21 international footballers
Republic of Ireland international footballers
Premier League players
English Football League players
National League (English football) players
Coventry City F.C. players
Rushden & Diamonds F.C. players
Oxford United F.C. players
Association football defenders
Republic of Ireland expatriate association footballers